doPDF is a Portable Document Format (PDF) printer developed by Softland, that allows any program that can print to create a PDF file. The resolution of the created PDF files can be set manually or done automatically. doPDF is freeware which displays advertisements.

doPDF is the simplified version of Softland's commercial novaPDF, which offers additional features, including Advanced Encryption Standard, password protection, digital signing, URL links support, text/images watermark, the ability to choose PDF version, etc.

Features
Softland's doPDF is a freeware application that is licensed for commercial and personal use. It supports 32-bit and 64-bit Windows 11, Windows 10, Windows 8, Windows 7, Vista, 2019, 2016, 2012 and 2008 R2. Earlier versions up until version 9 also supported XP, Windows Server 2000, 2003, and 2008 operating systems.

The application allows custom resolution settings from 72 to 2400 dpi, and predefined and custom page sizes. PDFs created from text documents remain searchable in all languages.

Older versions of doPDF do not use Ghostscript or .NET, and therefore is self-contained. They had a very small download file size, which was 1.73 MB in doPDF version 6.3.311 and 2.98 MB in version 7.0.321. More recent versions have expanded to over 60 MB. Softland claims that doPDF in use "Barely uses any computer resources - compared to other free PDF converters, doPDF barely uses any memory or CPU resources when doing the actual conversion to PDF."

According to their site: 

Once installed doPDF is accessed by selecting the doPDF printer from the print menu or dialog of any Windows application that can print. The application then asks the user where to save the document, prints it as a PDF file and opens it in the user's default PDF viewer.

Writing on Download.com, reviewer Seth Rosenblatt said of doPDF 6.2.301:

The company released version 7 of this application in early December 2009. This new updated version includes complete compatibility with Windows 7 as well as support for Type 1 fonts. Instead of embedding the full font file, doPDF 7 embeds only font subsets, making the resulting PDF file smaller.

Awards and recognition
doPDF was BetaNews Editor's Pick
Download of the day for 7 March 2007 at LifeHacker
Softpedia Pick rated at 4.2/5 Very Good

See also
List of PDF software

References

External links
 

Freeware
PDF software